2-bit may refer to:
 2-bit color, in computing
 2 Bit Pie, an English electronic music group
 2-bit architecture, used in some bit-slice processors

See also
 Bit
 Two bits (disambiguation)
 Dibit
 Crumb (unit)